Sardono Waluyo Kusumo (born March 6, 1945 in Surakarta (also called Solo)), is an Indonesian choreographer, dancer, film director and actor.

He studied classical Javanese dance and specialized afterwards in local dances in combination with modern dance techniques. In 1961 he led a major dance company of 250 dancers at the Hindu temple complex Prambanan, at about 18 km eastwards of Yogyakarta along the road to Surakarta. In the seventies he founded his own theater company, Dance Theatre Sardono.

Next to his dancing career, he also was an actor and film maker. Beside his professional career he is a promoter of the preservation of the rainforests in the country.

Honours and awards 
  Bintang Budaya Parama Dharma (Indonesia, 2003)
 Prince Claus Award (Netherlands, 1997)

Filmography 
 Actor
 1999: Sri
 1982: Rembulan dan Matahari
 1979: November 1828

References 

Indonesian film directors
Indonesian male film actors
Indonesian male dancers
Indonesian choreographers
People from Surakarta
Living people
1945 births